The Hotel Nichols is a brick hotel in South Haven, Michigan, with two stories comprising 17 rooms and 2 suites. The hotel is family-owned and operated on the corner of Center and Williams streets downtown. The hotel first opened for business in 1884.

History 
The Hotel Nichols is the only historic hotel still in downtown South Haven. The hotel has been run as a family business for over 100 years.

The hotel was opened in 1884 as the Webster's Hotel after the first owner E.C. Webster. In 1944, the Webster family sold the hotel to Donald and Elizabeth Nichols who changed the name to the Nichols Hotel. In 2002, the hotel changed ownership again in 2002 when Anna Rajer bought it. The hotel was run by Ratjer and her daughter Joanna until it was sold to the current owners Scott and Kary Whiteford in 2017.

1884–1944 
E.C. Webster opened the hotel and was ran as a family business until it was sold 1944.

From 1906 to 1944 a cafe was operated on the lower level of the hotel. E. C. Webster and his son Hollis Webster established Holly's Fountain Lunch in the lobby of the hotel in 1925. Ward Webster bought out his father's interest in the cafe, and moved to the location. This allowed Ward Webster to start a chain of restaurant called Holly's. After the chain expanded they had locations in most of the major cities. They company they founded was Holly's Inc., which owned 23 restaurants and six Holiday Inns. The chain had sales in 1982 of about $24 million (equivalent to  $ in ). The chain had locations in 1981 in South Haven, St. Joseph, Grand Rapids, and other major cities, including three locations in Indiana.

The names of the locations vary included Holly's Landing, Holly's Bistro, Ristorante Holly's and Holly's Steak. The first location out of South Haven was opened in St. Joseph in 1939 when they opened Holly's Grill.

1944–2002 
The Webster family sold the hotel to Donald and Elizabeth Nichols, who operated the hotel for almost 60 years. During that time the hotel suffered a fire.

In July 1951 the hotel suffered a fire which started in a refrigerator in the hotel kitchen. The kitchen was the only room impacted causing about $8,000 (equivalent to $ in ) in damages. At the time of the fire 25 guests were in the hotel, and they were led out by firefighters. Only one person was injured during the evacuation after being lowered down by rope.

References

External links 

Buildings and structures in Van Buren County, Michigan
1884 establishments in Michigan